Rye is an extinct town in Adair County, in the U.S. state of Missouri. The GNIS classifies it as a populated place, but the exact location of the town site is unknown.

A post office called Rye was established in 1882, and remained in operation until 1884. The community most likely was named after their rye crop.

References

Ghost towns in Missouri
Former populated places in Adair County, Missouri